Zaslav may refer to:

 Iziaslav, Ukraine
 Bernard Zaslav (1926–2016), American violist
 David Zaslav (born 1960), American television executive

See also
 
 Zasław (disambiguation), an alternative spelling
 Zaslavsky, a surname